Marta Orriols (Sabadell, 1975) is a Spanish writer. She graduated in History of Art but she decided to continue her training within the field of writing, which had led her to author a collection of short stories Anatomia de les distàncies curtes (2016) and her first novel, Aprendre a parlar amb les plantes (2018). A writer in the literature-of-manners style, her texts portray the complexity of human relations with highly emotionally-charged prose.

She studied cinematographic scriptwriting at the Bande à Part film school in Barcelona and creative writing at the Ateneu Barcelonès. She occasionally works as an editorial reader and is a contributor to several digital newspapers and magazines, publishing literary and cultural chronicles. She received the best 2018 novel in Catalan language award by Òmnium Cultural, the No Llegiu Prize, and the Illa dels Llibres Prize for Best Novel of 2018. Her novel has been translated to several languages, including English (Learning to talk to plants, published by Pushkin Press) and French. She lives in Barcelona with her two sons.

References 

 Marta Orriols at LletrA, Catalan Literature Online (Open University of Catalonia).

Writers from Barcelona
Writers from Catalonia
1975 births
Living people
People from Sabadell